Funairi-machi is a Hiroden station on the Hiroden Eba Line located in Funairi-machi, Naka-ku, Hiroshima. It is operated by the Hiroshima Electric Railway.

Routes
There are three routes that serve Funairi-machi Station:
 Hiroshima Station - Eba Route
 Yokogawa Station - Eba Route
 Hakushima - Eba Route

Station layout
The station consists of two staggered side platforms serving two tracks. Crosswalks connect the platforms with the sidewalk. There is a shelter located in the middle of each platform.

Adjacent stations

Surrounding area
Wel City, Hiroshima - Hiroshima Kosei Nenkin Kaikan
Aster Plaza
Municipal Kanzaki Elementary School in Hiroshima

History
Opened on December 28, 1943.

References

Funairi-machi Station
Railway stations in Japan opened in 1943